WIGV-LP (96.5 FM) is a low-power FM radio station broadcasting a Spanish religious format. Licensed to Providence, Rhode Island, United States, the station is currently owned by Casa De Oracion Getsemani.

History
The Federal Communications Commission issued a construction permit for the station on March 14, 2008. The station was assigned the WIGV-LP call sign on February 3, 2009, and received its license to cover on May 20, 2009.

References

External links
 Radio Renacer's website
 

Radio stations established in 2009
IGV-LP
IGV-LP
IGV-LP
2008 establishments in Rhode Island
Spanish-language radio stations in Rhode Island